The Kingdom of Hatra was a 2nd-century Arab kingdom located between the Roman Empire and the Parthian Empire, mostly under Parthian suzerainty, located in modern-day northern Iraq.

Name 
The name of "Hatra" appears various times in the Aramaic Hatrene inscriptions as ‎, probably meaning "enclosure, hedge, fence".

History
The history of Hatra before the Parthian era is obscure. It has been suggested that a settlement was founded there under the Assyrians or the Achaemenids, but that remains speculative. The earliest known records that mention Hatra are from the late 1st-century. The early rulers of Hatra used the title of marya (lord), but starting from the 170s, they started using the title of malka (king), often in the form of "King of the Arabs". This elevation of titulature is considered to be related to the Roman incorporation of Edessa in 165, which resulted in Hatra being the westernmost part of the Parthian Empire, and thus of higher strategic importance.

In the 1st and 2nd century, Hatra was ruled by a dynasty of Arab princes. It rose to prominence as the capital of Hatra and became an important religious center as a result of its strategic position along caravan trade routes.
Hatra is one of the first Arab states to be established outside of Arabia, preceded by the Kingdom of Osroene (132 BC–216 AD) and the Kingdom of Emesa (64 BCE–300s CE), and followed by the Ghassanids (220–638) and the Lakhmids (300–602), buffer states of the Roman and Sassanid Empires, respectively.

Hatra had withstood sieges by Roman emperors Trajan and Septimius Severus and the Sasanian king Ardashir I. The kingdom finally fell after the capture of Hatra by the Sasanians under Shapur I, who destroyed the city.

Culture 
Hatra was part of the Parthian commonwealth, a term used by historians to refer to cultures that were under Parthian control, but mainly populated by non-Iranians. Although the Hatran language and its cults were very similar to that of the rest of Aramaic-speaking world in Mesopotamia and Syria, the Parthian Empire had heavily influenced the culture and political system of Hatra, as attested by epigraphic and archaeological findings.

Many Parthian titles are known to have been used, many which were also used in slightly different variants in Armenia as well as some in Parthia. This includes titles such as naxwadār (also attested in Armenian as naxarar), which was seemingly used as a personal name in Hatra. Other titles include pasāgrīw (heir-apparent), bitaxs (possibly viceroy), asppat (head of cavalry), ašpazkan (chamberlain), hadarpat (possibly chiliarch), naxširpat (chief of the hunt), and dahicpat, a word used as an epithet of the god Nergol. Not all the titles are solely Parthian, as some of the seem to have been derived from Old Persian. Regardless, these titles are attested in all the western parts of the Parthian Empire, which indicates that the Hatran court was shaped to imitiate that of the Parthian royal court.

Like the rest of the Parthian commonwealth, Iranian personal names are also well attested in Hatra. The ruling family adopted the same names used by the Arsacid kings, such as Worod, Walagash and Sanatruq. The local populace also dressed in Parthian clothing, used Parthian jewellery and bore Parthian weapons.

List of rulers

See also 
 Arbayistan (Arbaya), the Sasanian province

References

Sources
 
 

 
 
 
 
 
 Michael Sommer: Hatra. Geschichte und Kultur einer Karawanenstadt im römisch-parthischen Mesopotamien. von Zabern, Mainz 2003, p. 23.
 
 

Ancient history of Iraq
Arab history
States and territories established in the 2nd century
States and territories disestablished in the 3rd century
Roman buffer states
240s disestablishments
Roman–Persian Wars
Parthian Empire
Post-Imperial Assyria
Former kingdoms